In mathematics, specifically in group theory, the direct product is an operation that takes two groups  and  and constructs a new group, usually denoted .  This operation is the group-theoretic analogue of the Cartesian product of sets and is one of several important notions of direct product in mathematics.

In the context of abelian groups, the direct product is sometimes referred to as the direct sum, and is denoted .  Direct sums play an important role in the classification of abelian groups: according to the fundamental theorem of finite abelian groups, every finite abelian group can be expressed as the direct sum of cyclic groups.

Definition 

The resulting algebraic object satisfies the axioms for a group.  Specifically:

Examples

Let  be the group of real numbers under addition.  Then the direct product  is the group of all two-component vectors  under the operation of vector addition:
.
Let  be the group of positive real numbers under multiplication. Then the direct product  is the group of all  vectors in the first quadrant under the operation of component-wise multiplication
.
Let  and  be cyclic groups with two elements each:

Then the direct product  is isomorphic to the Klein four-group:

Elementary properties

Algebraic structure
Let  and  be groups, let , and consider the following two subsets of :

    and    .

These subgroups of  have the following three important properties:

 The intersection  is trivial.
Together, these three properties completely determine the algebraic structure of the direct product .

In some contexts, the third property above is replaced by the following:

Examples

Presentations
Specifically, suppose that

 and 

Then

For example if

 and 

then

Normal structure

     and     .

Further properties

Universal property

The direct product  can be characterized by the following universal property. Let  and  be the projection homomorphisms.

Specifically, the homomorphism  is given by the formula
.
This is a special case of the universal property for products in category theory.

Subgroups

Moreover, the quotient of the direct products is isomorphic to the direct product of the quotients:
.

For example, if  is any non-trivial group, then the product  has a diagonal subgroup

The subgroups of direct products are described by Goursat's lemma.

Conjugacy and centralizers

  =  .

  =  .

Normalizers behave in a more complex manner since not all subgroups of direct products themselves decompose as direct products.

Automorphisms and endomorphisms

It follows that  has a subgroup isomorphic
to the direct product .

It is not true in general that every automorphism of  has the above form. For example, if  is any group, then there exists an automorphism  of  that switches the two factors, i.e.

.

This automorphism group is infinite, but only finitely many of the automorphisms have the form given above.

In general, every endomorphism of  can be written as a  matrix

When G and H are indecomposable, centerless groups, then the automorphism group is relatively straightforward, being Aut(G) × Aut(H) if G and H are not isomorphic, and Aut(G) wr 2 if G ≅ H, wr denotes the wreath product.  This is part of the Krull–Schmidt theorem, and holds more generally for finite direct products.

Generalizations

Finite direct products
It is possible to take the direct product of more than two groups at once.  Given a finite sequence  of groups, the direct product

is defined as follows:

This has many of the same properties as the direct product of two groups, and can be characterized algebraically in a similar way.

Infinite direct products
It is also possible to take the direct product of an infinite number of groups.  For an infinite sequence  of groups, this can be defined just like the finite direct product of above, with elements of the infinite direct product being infinite tuples.

More generally, given an indexed family {  } of groups, the direct product  is defined as follows:

Unlike a finite direct product, the infinite direct product  is not generated by the elements of the isomorphic subgroups {  }.  Instead, these subgroups generate a subgroup of the direct product known as the infinite direct sum, which consists of all elements that have only finitely many non-identity components.

Other products

Semidirect products

 The intersection  is trivial.
The resulting product still consists of ordered pairs , but with a slightly more complicated rule for multiplication.

It is also possible to relax the third condition entirely, requiring neither of the two subgroups to be normal.

Free products

That is, if

 = |     and      = |,

 = |.

Unlike the direct product, elements of the free product cannot be represented by ordered pairs.  In fact, the free product of any two nontrivial groups is infinite.  The free product is actually the coproduct in the category of groups.

Subdirect products

By Goursat's lemma, every subdirect product is a fiber product.

Fiber products

   =  {  }.

References

 
 .
 .
 
 .
 .

Group products